In Greek mythology, Calypso ("she who conceals") was a nymph who lived on the island of Ogygia, where, according to Homer's Odyssey, she detained Odysseus for seven years. She promised Odysseus immortality if he would stay with her, but Odysseus preferred to return home.

Etymology
The name "Calypso" may derive from the Ancient Greek , meaning "to cover", "to conceal", or "to hide".  According to Etymologicum Magnum, her name means "concealing the knowledge", which – combined with the Homeric epithet  (meaning "subtle" or "wily") – justifies the reclusive character of Calypso and her island.

Family
Calypso is generally said to be the daughter of the Titan Atlas. Her mother is mostly unnamed, but Hyginus wrote that it was Pleione, mother of the Pleiades. Hesiod, and the Homeric Hymn to Demeter, mention either a different Calypso or possibly the same Calypso as one of the Oceanid daughters of Tethys and Oceanus. Apollodorus includes the name Calypso in his list of Nereids, the daughters of Nereus and Doris. John Tzetzes makes her a daughter of Helios and the Oceanid nymph Perse, the parents of Circe, perhaps due to her association with Circe; the two goddesses were sometimes confused due to their behaviour and connection to Odysseus. According to a fragment from the Catalogue of Women, Calypso bore the Cephalonians to Hermes as suggested by Hermes' visits to her island in the Odyssey.

Mythology
In Homer's Odyssey, Calypso tries to keep the fabled Greek hero Odysseus on her island to make him her immortal husband, while he also gets to enjoy her sensual pleasures forever. According to Homer, Calypso kept Odysseus prisoner by force at Ogygia for seven years. Calypso enchants Odysseus with her singing as she moves to and fro, weaving on her loom with a golden shuttle. 

Odysseus comes to wish for circumstances to change. He can no longer bear being separated from his wife, Penelope, and wants to tell Calypso. He is seen sitting on a headland crying, and at night he is forced to sleep with her against his will. His patron goddess Athena asks Zeus to order the release of Odysseus from the island; Zeus orders the messenger Hermes to tell Calypso to set Odysseus free, for it was not Odysseus's destiny to live with her forever. She angrily comments on how the gods hate goddesses having affairs with mortals.

Calypso provides Odysseus with an axe, drill, and adze to build a boat. Calypso leads Odysseus to an island where he can chop down trees and make planks for his boat. Calypso also provides him with wine, bread, clothing, and more materials for his boat. The goddess then sets wind at his back when he sets sail. After seven years Odysseus has built his boat and leaves Calypso. 

Homer does not mention any children by Calypso. By some accounts that came after the Odyssey, Calypso bore Odysseus a son, Latinus, though Circe is usually given as Latinus' mother. In other accounts, Calypso bore Odysseus two children, Nausithous and Nausinous. 

The story of Odysseus and Calypso has some close resemblances to the interactions between Gilgamesh and Siduri in the Epic of Gilgamesh in that "the lone female plies the inconsolable hero-wanderer with drink and sends him off to a place beyond the sea reserved for a special class of honoured people" and "to prepare for the voyage he has to cut down and trim timbers."

A fragment from the Catalogue of Women, erroneously attributed to Hesiod, claimed that Calypso detained Odysseus for years as a favour to Poseidon, the sea-god who detested Odysseus for blinding his son Polyphemus.

According to Hyginus, Calypso killed herself because of her love for Odysseus.

Philosophy
Philosophers have written about the meaning of Calypso in the world of ancient Greece. Ryan Patrick Hanley commented on the interpretation of Calypso in Les Aventures de Télémaque written by Fénelon. Hanley says that the story of Calypso illustrates the link between Eros and pride. Theodor Adorno and Max Horkheimer brought attention to the combination of power over fate and the sensibility of "bourgeois housewives" in the depiction of Calypso.

Gallery

Notes

References 
 Apollodorus, Apollodorus, The Library, with an English Translation by Sir James George Frazer, F.B.A., F.R.S. in 2 Volumes. Cambridge, Massachusetts, Harvard University Press; London, William Heinemann Ltd. 1921.  Online version at the Perseus Digital Library.
 Budin, Stephanie L., Intimate Lives of the Ancient Greeks, Praeger publications, 2013, .
 Bulfinch, Thomas (2018-06-21). The Age of Fable: Stories of Gods and Heroes. Floating Press, The. .
 Caldwell, Richard, Hesiod's Theogony, Focus Publishing/R. Pullins Company (June 1, 1987). .
 Candau, Brittany, Castro, Nachie (2013-15-10). Disney Infinity: Infinite Possibilities. Disney Book Group. .
 Gagné, Renaud, Cosmography and the Idea of Hyperborea in Ancient Greece: A Philology of Worlds, Cambridge University Press, 2021, .
 Grimal, Pierre, The Dictionary of Classical Mythology, Wiley-Blackwell, 1996, . "Calypso" p. 86
 Dougherty, Carol (2001-04-05). The raft of Odysseus: the ethnographic imagination of Homer’s Odyssey. Oxford [England]: Oxford University Press, Incorporated. .
 Hall, Edith (2008). The return of Ulysses: a cultural history of Homer’s Odyssey. London: I.B. Tauris. . .
 Hard, Robin, The Routledge Handbook of Greek Mythology: Based on H.J. Rose's "Handbook of Greek Mythology", Psychology Press, 2004, .
 Hesiod, Theogony, in The Homeric Hymns and Homerica with an English Translation by Hugh G. Evelyn-White, Cambridge, Massachusetts., Harvard University Press; London, William Heinemann Ltd. 1914. Online version at the Perseus Digital Library.
 Hesiod, The Shield. Catalogue of Women. Other Fragments. Edited and translated by Glenn W. Most. Loeb Classical Library 503. Cambridge, MA: Harvard University Press, 2007, .
 Homer, The Odyssey with an English Translation by A.T. Murray, PH.D. in two volumes. Cambridge, Massachusetts., Harvard University Press; London, William Heinemann, Ltd. 1919. Online version at the Perseus Digital Library.
 Homeric Hymn to Demeter (2), in The Homeric Hymns and Homerica with an English Translation by Hugh G. Evelyn-White, Cambridge, Massachusetts., Harvard University Press; London, William Heinemann Ltd. 1914. Online version at the Perseus Digital Library.
 Hyginus, Gaius Julius, Fabulae in Apollodorus' Library and Hyginus' Fabulae: Two Handbooks of Greek Mythology, Translated, with Introductions by R. Scott Smith and Stephen M. Trzaskoma, Hackett Publishing Company,  2007. .
 Smith, William; Dictionary of Greek and Roman Biography and Mythology, London (1873). "Calypso" 
 Van Nortwick, Thomas (2009). The unknown Odysseus: alternate worlds in Homers Odyssey. Ann Arbor: University of Michigan Press. .
 West, M. L. (1966), Hesiod: Theogony, Oxford University Press. .

External links
 
 CALYPSO from The Theoi Project
 CALYPSO from Greek Mythology Link

 
Children of Atlas
Characters in the Odyssey
Suicides in Greek mythology
Textiles in folklore
Mythological rapists
Women of Hermes
Oceanids
Children of Helios
Odysseus
Nereids